Robert Noel Bodington (22 December 1894 – 30 October 1976) was an Australian rules footballer who played with Melbourne in the Victorian Football League (VFL).

He later served in France in World War I.

Notes

External links 

1894 births
Australian rules footballers from Melbourne
Melbourne Football Club players
Australian military personnel of World War I
1976 deaths
People from Carlton, Victoria
Military personnel from Melbourne